= Chris & Wes: Let's Do This =

- Genre: Documentary
- Starring: Chris & Wes
- Country of origin: United Kingdom
- Original language: English
- No. of series: 1
- No. of episodes: 10

Production
- Running time: 60mins (inc. adverts)

Original release
- Network: Sky1
- Release: 19 December 2011 – 13 February 2012

Chris & Wes: Let's Do This is a documentary reality show that was broadcast in the UK on Sky1 in December 2011.
